Penicillium vanbeymae is an anamorph species of fungus in the genus Penicillium.

References

vanbeymae
Fungi described in 1979